The Deosai Mountains are a range of mountains in the Himalayas. They lie to the southeast of the Indus river gorge in northern Pakistan, across the western border of Ladakh, and adjoin the Zaskar Range. The district of Kargil lies at the junction of the Deosai and the Greater Himalayan Range. To the east of the Deosai Mountains is the highland plateau of the Deosai Plains; although the two names are sometimes conflated. The runoff from the southern slopes of the Deosai Mountains forms a tributary that joins the Shiugo River, which then
merges with the Dras River.

References

Mountain ranges of Pakistan
Kargil district